Back Roads is a 1981 American romantic comedy film starring Sally Field and Tommy Lee Jones. It is directed by Martin Ritt. It got middling reviews and grossed $11 million at the box office. This was the first film produced by CBS Theatrical Films (a short lived film production branch of CBS). The film was distributed by Warner Bros.

Plot 
Amy Post is a $20-a-trick hooker in Mobile, Alabama. One night she entertains Elmore Pratt, an ex-boxer who has just been fired from his job at a car wash. He cannot pay her for services rendered.

Pratt punches a plainclothes police officer. He and Amy drive away together, intending to head for California, bickering along the way.

Production 
Field and Jones disliked one another intensely during filming. Ritt said that he regretted not being able to make this film work, blaming its failure on both the script and the stars' inability to get along. In her January 29, 2013 appearance on The Ellen DeGeneres Show, Field said that she and Jones reconciled many years later when he approached her at an event and apologized for being so difficult back then. They went on to co-star in the 2012 film, Lincoln, for which they both received Academy Award nominations for their supporting roles.

Reception
In his March 13, 1981 review, The New York Times critic Vincent Canby wrote that there "seems to be a real rapport" between the two actors. Canby described the film as "extremely appealing and occasionally gutsy and very funny." Other reviewers were less kind. Roger Ebert of the Chicago Sun-Times considered the movie formulaic and "heavily laden with schtick", giving the film two stars on a scale of four, although he did comment that Field "gives a performance that cannot be faulted." He considered Back Roads a "less-than-successful" effort by director Ritt.

Cast

References

External links 
 
 

1981 films
1981 romantic comedy films
American romantic comedy films
Films set in Alabama
Films shot in Mobile, Alabama
Films directed by Martin Ritt
CBS Theatrical Films films
Warner Bros. films
Films scored by Henry Mancini
Films about prostitution in the United States
Films with screenplays by Gary DeVore
1980s English-language films
1980s American films